Mount Little Xuebaoding (Tibetan name:Shar Dung Ri) is a mountain near the easternmost edge of the Tibetan Plateau in China. It is located in Songpan County of the Ngawa Tibetan and Qiang Autonomous Prefecture, Sichuan Province.

Little Xuebaoding was first climbed in May 2012 by an International team: Karim Adouane (France), Linda Eketoft (Sweden), Jon Otto (USA), Asu (China).

External links
 Publication in the American Alpine Club

Little Xuebaoding

zh:雪宝顶